Darlington Gyanfosu (born 10 June 1997) is a Ghanaian professional footballer who plays as a forward for Ghanaian Premier League side Karela United.

Career 
Gyanfosu previously played for then Nea Salamina Ghana now Wamanfo Mighty Royals FC. He has been playing for Western Region-based club Karela United since 2018. He played 15 league matches and scored 1 goal in the 2019–20 Ghana Premier League season before the league was put on hold and later cancelled due to the COVID-19 pandemic.

References

External links 

 

Living people
1997 births
Ghanaian footballers
Association football forwards
Ghana Premier League players
Karela United FC players